The 1989–90 NBA season was the Bulls' 24th season in the National Basketball Association. Despite their solid playoff run last year, the Bulls fired head coach Doug Collins and replaced him with assistant Phil Jackson, and received the sixth pick in the 1989 NBA draft, which they used to select Stacey King from the University of Oklahoma. Under Jackson, the Bulls held a 28–19 record at the All-Star break, finished the regular season second in the Central Division with a 55–27 record, averaging 109.5 points per game.

Michael Jordan averaged 33.6 points, 6.9 rebounds, 6.3 assists and 2.8 steals per game, was named to the All-NBA First Team, and NBA All-Defensive First Team, and finished in third place in Most Valuable Player voting, while Scottie Pippen continued to show improvement averaging 16.5 points, 6.7 rebounds, 5.4 assists and 2.6 steals per game. Jordan and Pippen were both selected for the 1990 NBA All-Star Game, which was Pippen's first All-Star appearance. In addition, Horace Grant provided the team with 13.4 points and 7.9 rebounds per game, while Bill Cartwright provided with 11.4 points and 6.5 rebounds per game, John Paxson contributed 10.0 points per game, and King was named to the NBA All-Rookie Second Team.

In the playoffs, the Bulls defeated the Milwaukee Bucks three games to one in the Eastern Conference First Round, then defeated the Philadelphia 76ers four games to one in the Eastern Conference Semi-finals. They advanced to the Eastern Conference Finals before losing a seven-game series to the eventual back-to-back champion Detroit Pistons, who they faced and lost against in last season's Eastern Conference Finals. The Pistons would go on to defeat the Portland Trail Blazers in five games in the NBA Finals, winning their second consecutive championship.

On March 28, 1990, Jordan scored a career-high of 69 points in a 117–113 road win over the Cleveland Cavaliers in overtime, the highest scoring output by an NBA player since David Thompson's 73 points on April 9, 1978, against the Detroit Pistons. Jordan also finished third in MVP voting behind Charles Barkley and Magic Johnson. In the summer of 1997, Jordan admitted that he went off for 69 points after the Cavaliers' fans cheered when Jordan was fouled hard by Hot Rod Williams, with Jordan lying on the ground in pain. Jordan stated, "I think the game I had against Cleveland, when I had 69, that was strictly off of anger and disappointment. Earlier in the first quarter, when I think I got a hard foul from Hot Rod and I—you know, I fell the wrong way, and I was really in pain. And the whole crowd cheered! And that right there pissed me off, because they (were) more in tune to winning than someone’s health. And that kind of got me fired up. That’s when I went crazy."

On February 14, 1990, before a game against the expansion Orlando Magic, Jordan's number 23 jersey was stolen from the Bulls' locker room at the Orlando Arena; Jordan had to wear a number 12 jersey, and scored 49 points as the Bulls lost to the Magic in overtime, 135–129.

Draft picks

Roster

Regular season

Season standings

z – clinched division title
y – clinched division title
x – clinched playoff spot

Record vs. opponents

Schedule

Playoffs

|- align="center" bgcolor="#ccffcc"
| 1
| April 27
| Milwaukee
| W 111–97
| Michael Jordan (38)
| Scottie Pippen (10)
| Scottie Pippen (13)
| Chicago Stadium18,676
| 1–0
|- align="center" bgcolor="#ccffcc"
| 2
| April 29
| Milwaukee
| W 109–102
| Michael Jordan (36)
| Michael Jordan (9)
| Michael Jordan (11)
| Chicago Stadium18,676
| 2–0
|- align="center" bgcolor="#ffcccc"
| 3
| May 1
| @ Milwaukee
| L 112–119
| Michael Jordan (48)
| Horace Grant (11)
| Scottie Pippen (9)
| Bradley Center18,575
| 2–1
|- align="center" bgcolor="#ccffcc"
| 4
| May 3
| @ Milwaukee
| W 110–86
| Michael Jordan (25)
| Horace Grant (14)
| Michael Jordan (5)
| Bradley Center18,633
| 3–1
|-

|- align="center" bgcolor="#ccffcc"
| 1
| May 4
| Philadelphia
| W 105–92
| Michael Jordan (29)
| Horace Grant (9)
| Scottie Pippen (7)
| Chicago Stadium18,676
| 1–0
|- align="center" bgcolor="#ccffcc"
| 2
| May 6
| Philadelphia
| W 112–100
| Michael Jordan (29)
| Scottie Pippen (11)
| Michael Jordan (9)
| Chicago Stadium18,676
| 2–0
|- align="center" bgcolor="#ffcccc"
| 3
| May 10
| @ Philadelphia
| L 97–99
| Michael Jordan (46)
| Scottie Pippen (13)
| Pippen, Jordan (6)
| Spectrum18,168
| 2–1
|- align="center" bgcolor="#ccffcc"
| 4
| May 12
| @ Philadelphia
| W 101–85
| Michael Jordan (25)
| Horace Grant (11)
| Michael Jordan (12)
| Spectrum17,514
| 3–1
|- align="center" bgcolor="#ccffcc"
| 5
| May 14
| Philadelphia
| W 100–95
| Michael Jordan (38)
| Michael Jordan (19)
| Michael Jordan (7)
| Chicago Stadium18,676
| 4–1
|-

|- align="center" bgcolor="#ffcccc"
| 1
| May 20
| @ Detroit
| L 77–86
| Michael Jordan (34)
| Horace Grant (9)
| Michael Jordan (5)
| The Palace of Auburn Hills21,454
| 0–1
|- align="center" bgcolor="#ffcccc"
| 2
| May 22
| @ Detroit
| L 93–102
| Michael Jordan (20)
| Horace Grant (9)
| Michael Jordan (7)
| The Palace of Auburn Hills21,454
| 0–2
|- align="center" bgcolor="#ccffcc"
| 3
| May 26
| Detroit
| W 107–102
| Michael Jordan (47)
| Pippen, Grant (11)
| Scottie Pippen (5)
| Chicago Stadium18,676
| 1–2
|- align="center" bgcolor="#ccffcc"
| 4
| May 28
| Detroit
| W 108–101
| Michael Jordan (42)
| Horace Grant (13)
| Michael Jordan (9)
| Chicago Stadium18,676
| 2–2
|- align="center" bgcolor="#ffcccc"
| 5
| May 30
| @ Detroit
| L 83–97
| Michael Jordan (22)
| Horace Grant (12)
| Michael Jordan (8)
| The Palace of Auburn Hills21,454
| 2–3
|- align="center" bgcolor="#ccffcc"
| 6
| June 1
| Detroit
| W 109–91
| Michael Jordan (29)
| Horace Grant (14)
| Pippen, Grant (5)
| Chicago Stadium18,676
| 3–3
|- align="center" bgcolor="#ffcccc"
| 7
| June 3
| @ Detroit
| L 74–93
| Michael Jordan (31)
| Horace Grant (14)
| Michael Jordan (9)
| The Palace of Auburn Hills21,454
| 3–4
|-

Player statistics

Season

Playoffs

Awards and records
Craig Hodges, NBA All-Star Weekend Three-Point Shootout Winner
Michael Jordan, All-NBA First Team
Michael Jordan, NBA All-Defensive First Team
Stacey King, NBA All-Rookie Team 2nd Team
Michael Jordan, NBA All-Star Game
Scottie Pippen, NBA All-Star Game

Transactions

References

Chicago Bulls seasons
Chic
1989 in sports in Illinois
Chicago